The Vale of Catmose is an area of relatively low-lying land, much of which is flooded by Rutland Water, in western Rutland, England.
 
The Catmose College (1972 - 2009 the Vale of Catmose College) is a school located in Oakham. Catmose is the name of the offices of Rutland County Council. Catmose Vale was the name of a former hospital in Oakham.

References

Valleys of Rutland
Oakham